= Fatima al-Ashabi =

Yemeni poet

Fatima al-Ashabi or Fatima al-'Ushbi (born 1959 - 24 October 2021) was a Yemeni poet.

== Works ==
- Wahaj al-fajr [The Glow of Dawn], 1991
- Innaha Fatima [She is Fatima], Baghdad, 2000.
